Radioactivity is the property of spontaneous nuclear decay, or the frequency of that decay.

Radioactivity may also refer to:

Entertainment
 Radio-Activity, 1975 album by Kraftwerk
 "Radioactivity" (song), by Kraftwerk

See also
 Radioactive (disambiguation)